Wheel of Fortune is an American television game show that was created by Merv Griffin and first aired in 1975, with a syndicated version airing since 1983. Since its premiere, the program has been adapted into several international versions. The 1975 version premiered on Australian TV in 1981 and premiered in the UK in 1988. It has also been adapted to numerous countries around the world.

International versions
Legend:
 Currently airing 
 Awaiting confirmation 
 Status unknown 
 Upcoming season 
 No longer airing

See also
List of television show franchises

References

External links
Official site of the Singapore edition (via internet Archive)

Wheel of Fortune (franchise)
Television lists by series